She Rides Wild Horses is the twenty-third studio album by American country music singer Kenny Rogers. It was released in 1999 on his own Dreamcatcher Records label. The album includes the singles "The Greatest," "Slow Dance More" and "Buy Me a Rose," all of which charted on the Billboard country singles charts.

History
Rogers had not charted a country hit since "If You Want to Find Love" in late 1991-early 1992. "The Greatest," his first release on his own label, brought him to the charts for the first time in nearly eight years, spending twenty weeks on the Hot Country Singles & Tracks (now Hot Country Songs) charts and peaking at 26. After it came "Slow Dance More" at 67, followed by "Buy Me a Rose," with backing vocals from Alison Krauss and Billy Dean. This song went to Number One on the country charts and number 40 on the Billboard Hot 100, giving Rogers his first Number One since 1987. The song also made Rogers, who was 61 at the time, the oldest country artist to achieve a Number One hit.

Critical reception
Giving it three stars out of five, Stephen Thomas Erlewine of Allmusic considered it a stronger album than Rogers' 1998 Across My Heart and a return to his 1980s sound, but said that some of the song selection was "uneven."

Track listing

Personnel
As listed in liner notes.

 Kenny Rogers – lead vocals
 Bobby Ogdin – keyboards
 Steve Mandile – all guitars (1, 2, 4-9), electric guitar (10)
 Richard Bailey – banjo (1)
 Russ Pahl – steel guitar (1)
 Bruce Bouton – steel guitar (2, 4)
 Steve Gibson – all guitars (3)
 Mark Selby – rhythm guitar (10)
 Biff Watson – acoustic guitar (10)
 Steve Glassmeyer  – mandolin (10)
 Spencer Campbell – bass
 Eddie Bayers – drums
 Bobby Taylor – English horn and oboe (4, 5)
 Jonathan Yudkin – fiddle (1), violin (3)
 Michael Black – backing vocals (1, 3, 5)
 Thom Flora – backing vocals (1, 10)
 Billy Dean – backing vocals (2)
 Alison Krauss – backing vocals (2, 4)
 Tammy Fry – harmony vocals (3, 5, 9)
 Yvonne Hodges – backing vocals (5)
 Carolyn Dawn Johnson – harmony vocals (6)
 Billy Montana – backing vocals (7)
 Jack Sundrud – backing vocals (7)
 Strings on Tracks 2-9 performed by The Nashville String Machine; Carl Gorodetzky, concertmaster. Arranged and conducted by Bergen White.

Production 
 Tracks 1-4 produced by Kenny Rogers; Tracks 5-10 produced by Brent Maher and Jim McKell for Maher Productions.
 Executive producer – Jim Mazza
 Recorded and mixed by Brent Maher and Jim McKell
 Assistant engineers – Jason Breckling, Otto D'Agnolo, Thomas Johnson, Eric Katte, Mark Niemiec, Gary Paczosa, Paul Skaife and Jamison Weddle.
 Recorded and mixed at Creative Recording, Inc. (Nashville, TN).
 Editing – Eric Conn, Frank Green, Carlos Grier and Mills Logan.
 Mastered by Denny Purcell and Jonathan Russell at Georgetown Masters (Nashville, TN).
 Art direction – P. David Elezear and Nick Long
 Photography – Jim "Señor" McGuire
 Management – Ken Kragen and Jim Mazza
 Booking – Greg Oswald at William Morris Agency

Charts

Weekly charts

Year-end charts

References

1999 albums
Kenny Rogers albums
Albums produced by Brent Maher